At The Foot Of My Rival is the sixth album by The New Amsterdams released on September 25, 2007. It was released on CD, download and 180g vinyl, and is the first New Amsterdams album to be released on Curb Appeal Records.

Track listing

Reception 
"...The New Amsterdams wouldn’t be The New Amsterdams if it wasn’t for songs like “Wait” where Pryor sounds as good as he ever sounded.[...] Unfortunately not all of the songs on here are as good as this one or as “Fountain of Youth” but overall “At The Foot Of My Rival” is yet another solid release by a great songwriter." - Punkrocktheory

"Matt Pryor and The New Amsterdams are back with relatively soft, yet pleasant, melodies on their sixth album, At the Foot of My Rival. Though not exactly a priceless discovery, the group experiments with raw sounds (the album was mostly a home recording) and varied instrumentation that separates Rival from its predecessors." - Americansongwriter

Personnel
Matt Pryor - Vocals, Guitar
Bill Belzer - Drums
Eric McCann - Upright Bass
Dustin Kinsey - Guitar
Zach Holland - Keyboard
Hannah Kendle - Vocals
Chris Leopold - Vocals
Colin Mahoney - Engineer, Mixing
Matthew Doyle - Layout Design
Geoff McCann - Artwork

References

2007 albums
The New Amsterdams albums